William George Hill  (7 August 1940 – 17 December 2021) was an English geneticist and statistician.  He was a professor at University of Edinburgh. He is credited as co-discoverer of the Hill–Robertson effect with his doctoral advisor, Alan Robertson.

Education
Hill was educated at St Albans School, Hertfordshire and studied agriculture at Wye College, University of London graduating with a Bachelor of Science degree in 1961. He studied genetics at the University of California, Davis, graduating with a Master of Science degree in 1963, then moved to Edinburgh to pursue a PhD in population genetics with Alan Robertson. His presented thesis was "Studies on artificial selection". He was awarded a Doctor of Science degree in 1976 for research on quantitative genetics.

Research and career
Hill was distinguished for his theoretical contributions to the study of the population and quantitative genetics of finite populations, in particular with respect to multilocus problems. He was the first to present formulae for the expected association of linked genes in finite populations due to random sampling of gametes and for the estimation of these associations from genotype frequencies. He has made major contributions to the analysis of quantitative variation in random breeding populations, both in the design and interpretation of selection experiments and in the analysis of similarity between relatives. He applied these concepts in his own selection experiments in the laboratory and in farm animal improvement programmes.

Hill served as editor in chief of the Proceedings of the Royal Society B from 2005 to 2009.

Awards and honours
Hill was elected a Fellow of the Royal Society of Edinburgh in 1979, a Fellow of the Royal Society (FRS) in 1985 and appointed OBE in 2004.

In 2018 he was awarded The Royal Society's Darwin Medal for his research in quantitative genetics.

In 2019 he was awarded The Genetics Society's Mendel Medal at The Centenary of Genetics Conference, for his contribution to quantitative genetics.

References

1940 births
2021 deaths
English geneticists
Academics of the University of Edinburgh
Fellows of the Royal Society
Fellows of the Royal Society of Edinburgh
Officers of the Order of the British Empire
English statisticians
People educated at St Albans School, Hertfordshire
University of California, Davis alumni
Place of birth missing
Alumni of the University of London
Academic journal editors
Alumni of Wye College